Osinsky Uyezd was an administrative division of Perm Governorate, Russian Empire, which existed in 1781–1923. Administrative center was town of Osa. Area: 19,246 km².

Demographics
At the time of the Russian Empire Census of 1897, Osinsky Uyezd had a population of 321,774. Of these, 82.7% spoke Russian, 10.7% Bashkir, 4.8% Tatar and 1.8% Udmurt as their native language.

References

Sources 
Brockhaus and Efron Encyclopedic Dictionary (1890–1907)

 
1781 establishments in the Russian Empire
Uezds of Perm Governorate
History of Perm Krai
History of Udmurtia